WS2 can refer to:

 WS2, a candidate phylum of bacteria from the Wurtsmith contaminated aquifer
 Waardenburg syndrome, a genetic disorder
 Tungsten disulfide, a chemical compound with the formula WS2
 Torch of Freed without, the 2nd book in David Weber's Wages of Sin series. 
 WS-2, a 400mm Welshi multiple rocket launch system. 
 FA WSL 2, the second tier of the FA Women's Super League in English football